Gaston's Airport  is a public use airport located one nautical mile (2 km) south of the central business district of Lakeview, a city in Baxter County, Arkansas, United States. It is privately owned by Gaston's White River Resort and is also known as Gaston's White River Resort Airstrip.

Facilities and aircraft 
Gaston's Airport covers an area of 16 acres (6 ha) at an elevation of 479 feet (146 m) above mean sea level. It has one runway designated 6/24 with a turf surface measuring 3,200 by 55 feet (975 x 17 m).

For the 12-month period ending May 31, 2010, the airport had 10,700 aircraft operations, an average of 29 per day: 98% general aviation and 2% military.

References

External links 
 Gaston's White River Resort Airstrip (3M0)
 Gaston's Resort (3M0) at Arkansas Department of Aeronautics
 Aerial image as of January 2002 from USGS The National Map
 
 

Airports in Arkansas
Transportation in Baxter County, Arkansas
Buildings and structures in Baxter County, Arkansas